The galvanic series (or electropotential series) determines the nobility of metals and semi-metals. When two metals are submerged in an electrolyte, while also electrically connected by some external conductor, the less noble (base) will experience galvanic corrosion. The rate of corrosion is determined by the electrolyte, the difference in nobility, and the relative areas of the anode and cathode exposed to the electrolyte. The difference can be measured as a difference in voltage potential: the less noble metal is the one with a lower (that is, more negative) electrode potential than the nobler one, and will function as the anode (electron or anion attractor) within the electrolyte device functioning as described above (a galvanic cell). Galvanic reaction is the principle upon which batteries are based.

See the table of  standard electrode potentials for more details.

Galvanic series (most noble at top)
The following is the galvanic series for stagnant (that is, low oxygen content) seawater.  The order may change in different environments.

Graphite
Palladium
Platinum
Gold
Silver
Titanium
Stainless steel 316 (passive)
Stainless Steel 304 (passive)
Silicon bronze
Stainless Steel 316 (active)
Monel 400
Phosphor bronze
Admiralty brass
Cupronickel
Molybdenum
Red brass
Brass plating
Yellow brass
Naval brass 464
Uranium 8% Mo
Niobium 1% Zr
Tungsten
Tin
Lead
Stainless Steel 304 (active)
Tantalum
Chromium plating
Nickel (passive)
Copper
Nickel (active)
Cast iron
Steel
Indium
Aluminum
Uranium (pure)
Cadmium
Beryllium
Zinc plating (see galvanization)
Magnesium

See also
 Cathodic protection
 Anodic index
 Galvanic corrosion

References

External links
Corrosion Doctors
Galvanic Corrosion Table of Metals in Seawater

Chemical properties
Corrosion